Lighthouse Labs is a tech education company that offers 12-week boot camps for web development and data science, as well as part-time up-skilling courses, with locations across Canada. In previous years, they organized an annual free learn-to-code event, The HTML500, in partnership with Telus.

Locations

Vancouver
Opened in 2013, Lighthouse Labs' first immersive boot camp facility started out of Launch Academy, an incubator in the heart of the city's Gastown neighborhood, before moving to new premises in the heart of downtown Vancouver in 2018. Students learn front and back-end development through the boot camp's web development full-time program and learn data science with a 12-week Data Science Bootcamp.

The iOS program, launched in July 2014, was arguably Canada's first immersive iOS immersive program and ran through the summer of 2019.

Toronto
As part of a national partnership with Highline, a seed-stage investment platform, Lighthouse Labs announced the launch of its Toronto operations during The HTML500 in February 2015. Located in Devhub in downtown Toronto, Lighthouse Labs joins existing Toronto-based boot camps such as Bitmaker Labs, BrainStation, and HackerYou, as one of several developer boot camps that offer in-person learning opportunities to individuals in the Greater Toronto Area.

Montreal 
Operating out of the beautiful Spaces Mile End, Lighthouse Labs Montreal currently offers a 12-week Data Science Bootcamp, 12-week Web Development Bootcamp, and three part-time courses in web development and data analytics.

Victoria 
Located in downtown Victoria at KWENCH, Lighthouse Labs immersed themselves in the local tech community by partnering with various community Tech leaders such as Viatech and Ladies Learning code. The Victoria location currently runs the web development boot camp and data science boot camp twice a year and three 6-week part-time web and data analytics programs.

Calgary 
In April 2015, Lighthouse Labs launched a 'pop-up' program in Calgary through its national partnership with Highline, a co-venture platform that helps early-stage digital startups. Originally a 6-week part-time program, it has grown into a satellite campus offering full- and part-time courses in front- and back-end development.[8][9] With on-site mentorship and access to student aid and in-person career services, Lighthouse Labs have seen its cohort numbers grow over the past year.

Ottawa
Lighthouse Labs hosts their part-time courses at Bayview Yards and hosts a Bootcamp to become a developer in 12 weeks at Spaces Laurier.

Scholarships

Simon Fraser University 
The 'Lighthouse Labs Prize' is an annual scholarship open to students of Simon Fraser University's Faculty of Communication, Art & Technology. Worth over $7000, the scholarship awards one student a spot in the boot camp's web-development program in Vancouver and is currently in its second year of institution.

Futures in Innovation and Technology 
Futures in Innovation and Technology, a digital skills training initiative of the First Nations Technology Council, is open to all Indigenous peoples in British Columbia. With over $150,000 in First Nations Technology Council funding and the new Lighthouse Labs Scholarship Fund, seats will be immediately available in the Web Development boot camp program.

COVID-19 Scholarship Fund 
Part-time course scholarships

Scholarships of $750 are available for any part-time courses.

Full-time boot camp scholarships

Scholarships are available in varying amounts, up to $5,000 towards our Data Science and Web Development boot camps.

See also 
 Coursera
 The Data Incubator
 Codecademy
 Khan Academy
 General Assembly
 Lynda.com
 App Academy
 Bloc (code school)

References

External links
Lighthouse Labs website

Computer programming
Computer science education